The 1949 municipal election was held November 2, 1949 to elect a mayor and six aldermen to sit on Edmonton City Council.  The electorate also decided eight plebiscite questions.  There were no elections for school trustees, as candidates for both the public and separate boards were acclaimed.

There were ten aldermen on city council, but four of the positions were already filled:
Frederick John Mitchell, Sidney Bowcott, Athelstan Bissett (SS), and Richmond Francis Hanna were all elected to two-year terms in 1948 and were still in office.  Sidney Parsons was also elected in 1948 to a two-year term, but he resigned in order to run for mayor; accordingly, Edwin Clarke was elected to a one-year term.

There were seven trustees on the public school board, but three of the positions were already filled:
Harry Fowler, James MacDonald, and Robert Rae had been acclaimed to two-year terms in 1948 and were still in office.  The same was true on the separate board,  where Adrian Crowe (SS), Joseph O'Hara, and Francis Killeen were continuing.

Voter turnout

There were 26,606 ballots cast out of 86,839 eligible voters, for a voter turnout of 30.6%.

Results

 bold or  indicates elected
 italics indicate incumbent
 "SS", where data is available, indicates representative for Edmonton's South Side, with a minimum South Side representation instituted after the city of Strathcona, south of the North Saskatchewan River, amalgamated into Edmonton on February 1, 1912.

Mayor

Aldermen

Public school trustees

George Brown, Mary Butterworth (SS), J W K Shortreed, and John Thorogood (SS) were acclaimed.

Separate (Catholic) school trustees

Joseph Gallant, Lawrence Keylor (SS), Ambrose O'Neill, and Joseph Pilon were acclaimed.

Plebiscites

 Financial plebiscite items required a minimum two-thirds "Yes" majority to bring about action

Paving

Shall Council pass a bylaw creating a debenture debt in the sum of $1,260,000.00 for City share of paving, mainly on arterial streets and bus routes.  Serial Plan debentures to be issued, 30-year term; interest rate 3 per centum per annum, payable semi-annually?
Yes - 9,968 (87.6%)
No - 1,409

High Level Bridge

Shall Council pass a bylaw creating a debenture debt in the sum of $1,000,000.00 for the purpose of providing a four-lane vehicular traffic deck on the High Level Bridge to relieve serious traffic congestion between North and South Sides of the river.  Serial plan debentures to be issued, 30-year term; interest 3 per centum per annum, payable semi-annually?
Yes - 8,931 (75.4%)
No - 2,656

Street Grading, Cleaning, and Flushing

Shall Council pass a bylaw creating a debenture debt in the sum of $140,000.00 to purchase equipment for the Engineer's Department of the City for grading, cleaning and flushing of streets and catch basins and for scavenger trucks and similar purposes?
Yes - 9,531 (85.9%)
No - 1,558

Engineer's Department Storage

Shall Council pass a bylaw creating a debenture debt in the sum of $110,000.00 for the erection of one building on the North Side of the river and one building on the South Side, both said buildings to be used for the storage of equipment of the Engineer's Department?
Yes - 6,954 (67.1%)
No - 3,400

Paving Plant

Shall Council pass a bylaw creating a debenture debt in the sum of $25,000.00 to increase the capacity of the City's paving plant?
Yes -  8,670 (82.2%)
No - 1,877

Fire Stations

Shall Council pass a bylaw creating a debenture debt in the sum of $245,000.00 for new fire stations and additions to existing fire stations, including Alarms communication Building, for the City Fire Department?
Yes - 10,231 (90.4%)
No - 1,091

Fire Fighting Equipment

Shall Council pass a bylaw creating a debenture debt in the sum of $405,000.00 to purchase equipment and apparatus, such as pumpers, aerial ladder, high pressure fog wagon, fire alarm extension system and revision of outside electrical circuits to improve fire fighting capacity of the Fire Department?
Yes - 10,111 (90.7%)
No - 1,039

Comfort Stations

Shall Council pass a bylaw creating a debenture debt in the sum of $40,000.00 to erect comfort station buildings?
Yes - 7,255 (69.5%)
No -  3,190

References

Election History, City of Edmonton: Elections and Census Office

1949
1949 elections in Canada
1949 in Alberta